The 1983 Bowling Green Falcons football team was an American football team that represented Bowling Green University in the Mid-American Conference (MAC) during the 1983 NCAA Division I-A football season. In their seventh season under head coach Denny Stolz, the Falcons compiled an 8–3 record (7–2 against MAC opponents), finished in a tie for second place in the MAC, and outscored their opponents by a combined total of 277 to 242.

The team's statistical leaders included Brian McClure with 3,264 passing yards, Darryl Story with 724 rushing yards, and Stan Hunter with 1,107 receiving yards.

Schedule

References

Bowling Green
Bowling Green Falcons football seasons
Bowling Green Falcons football